Hitler: The Last Ten Days is a 1973 biographical drama film depicting the days leading up to Adolf Hitler's suicide. The film stars Alec Guinness and Simon Ward, and features an introduction presented by Alistair Cooke; the original music score was composed by Mischa Spoliansky. The film is based on the book Hitler's Last Days: An Eye-Witness Account (first translated in English in 1973) by Gerhard Boldt, an officer in the German Army who survived the Führerbunker. Location shooting for the film included the De Laurentiis Studios in Rome and parts of England.

Plot
The film opens with Hitler's 56th birthday, on 20 April 1945, and ends 10 days later with his suicide, on 30 April.

Cast
 Alec Guinness – Adolf Hitler
 Simon Ward – Captain Albert Hoffmann
 Adolfo Celi – General Hans Krebs
 Diane Cilento – Hanna Reitsch
 Gabriele Ferzetti – Field Marshal Wilhelm Keitel
 Eric Porter – General von Greim
 Doris Kunstmann – Eva Braun
 Joss Ackland – General Wilhelm Burgdorf
 John Bennett – Joseph Goebbels
 John Barron – Dr. Stumpfegger
 Barbara Jefford – Magda Goebbels
 Valerie Gray – Helga Goebbels
 Ann Lynn – Traudl Junge
 Sheila Gish – Frau Christian
 Julian Glover – Gruppenführer Hermann Fegelein
 Michael Goodliffe – General Helmut Weidling
 Mark Kingston – Martin Bormann
 Timothy West – Professor Karl Gebhardt
 Andrew Sachs – Walter Wagner
 Philip Stone – General Alfred Jodl

Home media
The film was released on DVD on 3 June 2008, and was released on Blu-ray in September 2015.

See also
 The Last Ten Days (1955), a film
 The Death of Adolf Hitler (Sunday Night Theatre episode) (1973), a British television film
 The Bunker (1981), a CBS television film
 Downfall (2004), a film

References

External links
 
 

1973 films
1970s biographical drama films
1970s historical drama films
British biographical drama films
British historical drama films
Italian biographical drama films
English-language Italian films
Films about Adolf Hitler
Films about the Battle of Berlin
Films set in 1945
Films shot in England
Films shot in Rome
Paramount Pictures films
Death of Adolf Hitler
1973 drama films
1973 war films
Film controversies in Israel
1970s English-language films
1970s British films
1970s Italian films